Copse Hill is a low-rise district of the London Borough of Merton to the south of Wimbledon Common, associated with Raynes Park its nearest railway station. It is on higher ground and has the largest green spaces associated with the Raynes Park/West Wimbledon area surrounding it. It was almost entirely privately developed; the nearest social housing areas are in Wimbledon, and Putney Vale.

, a little of its undeveloped land is being built upon, in projects begun in about the year 2017 mainly in its Wimbledon Hill Park development, estate or neighbourhood by Berkeley Homes.

References

Areas of London
Districts of the London Borough of Merton